Lesouchastok 831 is a rural locality (a settlement) in Frolovskoye Rural Settlement, Permsky District, Perm Krai, Russia. The population was 87 as of 2010. There are 24 streets.

Geography 
Lesouchastok 831 is located 28 km southeast of Perm (the district's administrative centre) by road. Molokovo is the nearest rural locality.

References 

Rural localities in Permsky District